Michael L. Howard is a retired United States Army lieutenant general who last served as the deputy commander of the United States European Command. Prior to that, he was the command's operations director.

Howard earned a B.S. degree in biology from Mercer University in 1986. He later received an M.S. degree in national security strategic studies from the National War College.

Prior to his current European assignment, Howard served for two years as the commanding officer of the Military District of Washington (MDW). During that time, he also served as the official escort for former President George W. Bush and his family during the state funeral for his father, former President George H. W. Bush, in late 2018.

Awards and decorations

References

Year of birth missing (living people)
Living people
Mercer University alumni
National War College alumni
Recipients of the Legion of Merit
United States Army generals
Recipients of the Defense Superior Service Medal